Canyon Bomber is a black-and-white 1977 arcade game, developed and published by Atari, Inc. It was written by Howard Delman who previously programmed Super Bug for Atari. Canyon Bomber was rewritten in color and with a different visual style for the Atari VCS and published in 1979.

Gameplay

The player and an opponent fly a blimp or biplane over a canyon full of numbered, circular rocks, arranged in layers. The player does not control the flight of vehicles, but only presses a single button to drop a bomb which destroys rocks and gives points. Each rock is labeled with the points given for destroying it. As the number of rocks is reduced, it becomes harder to hit them without missing. The third time a player drops a bomb without hitting a rock, the game is over.

Development
To create Canyon Bomber, Delman modified a Sprint 2 board which he then programmed. The first version of the game required 3K of ROM. As ROMs were expensive at the time, Delman's supervisor requested that he fit the game into 2K, which he did.

Ports
An Atari 2600 port was developed by then-Atari employee David Crane. It uses solid bricks rather than round rocks. Instead of visible point values, each layer of bricks has a color corresponding to its worth. It also includes Sea Bomber game modes where players destroy ships instead of rocks.

Legacy
The 1981 VIC-20 game Blitz was inspired by a description of Canyon Bomber and used buildings as the targets instead of rocks. That change inspired many subsequent Blitz clones for different systems.

Canyon Bomber was re-released as part of Atari Collection 1 for the Evercade in 2020.

See also

List of Atari 2600 games

References

External links
 
 Canyon Bomber for the 2600 at Atari Mania

1977 video games
Arcade video games
Atari 2600 games
Atari arcade games
Video games developed in the United States